The 2019–20 season was Greuther Fürth's 117th season in existence, and their seventh consecutive season in the 2. Bundesliga since relegation from the Bundesliga in 2013. In addition to the domestic league, Greuther Fürth participated in this season's edition of the DFB-Pokal. The season covered the period from 1 July 2019 to 30 June 2020.

Players

Current squad

Friendly matches

Competitions

Overview

2. Bundesliga

League table

Results by round

Matches

DFB-Pokal

References 

SpVgg Greuther Fürth seasons
2019–20 in German football leagues
2. Bundesliga seasons